Forgotten Freshness is a rarities album by American hip hop group Insane Clown Posse. Released in 1995, the album features unreleased and "lost" tracks that are harder to find elsewhere.

This album features some samples that were not cleared for national distribution; therefore, this album was only released in the Detroit area and the mid-west and in limited copies. In 1998, the group released Forgotten Freshness Volumes 1 & 2. "Ghetto Zone", "Life At Risk", and "Ask You Somethin" were not featured on the re-release, with "Ask You Somethin" appearing on no other release. The edits of "Southwest Strangla" and "3 Rings" are also exclusive to this compilation, the former featuring an intro that would later become part of "12" from the Riddle Box album and the latter featuring an answering machine message. It is the group's first installment in the "Forgotten Freshness album series", their 1st compilation album, and their 6th overall release.

Music and lyrics
The song "Southwest Strangla" was planned to be released on Shaggy 2 Dope's second solo album Shaggs The Clown, but the entire project was scrapped. In the beginning of the song, a news brief is played about the actual looting of Northwest Airlines Flight 255 which crashed on I-94 in Detroit in 1987. With a change in beat and lyrics, the song "Hey, Vato" became "Wagon Wagon" found on the Ringmaster album. Some lyrics from the song are also found on the song "Who Asked You", also on the Ringmaster.

The song "Fat Sweaty Betty" was originally intended for Riddle Box. It was eventually given away as a single at the group's two "Mental Warp" shows. "Ask You Somethin" is a cover of Clarence Carter's song "Strokin" and was originally intended for Carnival of Carnage. The song "3 Rings" was later released on the album Riddle Box with slightly altered lyrics. "Dead Pumpkins" was the first Hallowicked single given away in 1994.

Track listing

References

Self-released albums
Insane Clown Posse compilation albums
1995 compilation albums
Psychopathic Records compilation albums
Horrorcore compilation albums